Donervon Joseph Daniels (born 24 November 1993) is a Montserratian professional footballer who plays as a centre-back for Walsall.

Club career

West Bromwich Albion
Daniels joined West Bromwich Albion in 2009 from Reading and quickly made himself a regular in Albion's FA Premier Academy League Under-18s side before moving into the Under-21s and captaining them. Developing through the academy, Daniels was awarded with first professional contract, which keep him until 2013. Not only that, Daniels ended up being awarded the Baggies’ 2011–12 Young Player of the Year Award.

After his loan spell at West Brom came to an end, the club opted to take up their option of a contract extension on Daniels to stay for another season. After Daniels skippered Albion to victory in the Birmingham Senior Cup final against Tamworth in 2014, the club, again, opted to take up their option of a contract extension on Daniels to stay for another season. Daniels had his contract extended for another season.

In the 2012–13 season, Daniels joined Tranmere Rovers on 22 November 2012, on loan. He made his debut on 21 December, in a heavy 5–0 defeat away to Swindon Town. His five appearances with Tranmere Rovers led Daniels to have a loan extension for further month, before it was extended until the end of the season. On 19 February 2013, Daniels scored his first senior goal, in a 3–1 defeat against Swindon. After making thirteen appearances and scoring once, Daniels returned to his parent club after being recalled.

On 25 November 2013, Daniels joined Gillingham on loan until 3 January 2014 and he played the following evening against Stevenage, where he scored in the 52nd minute on his debut in a 3–2 home victory for Gillingham. After making three appearances and scoring once, Daniels returned to his parent club.

On 1 August 2014, he joined Blackpool on a 28-day youth loan. He made his debut for the club on 9 August, losing 2–0 to Nottingham Forest in the opening game of the season. Daniels loan spell with Blackpool was soon extended until 2 January 2015.

In November 2014, Blackpool were fined £30,000 for playing Daniels after his youth loan had expired. He had played against Millwall on 30 August 2014. Daniels then scored his first goal for the club on 18 October 2014, in a 4–2 loss against Huddersfield Town. By the end of November, Daniels missed four matches over "rules prevent clubs naming more than five loan players in their team". Daniels made his return on his last appearance on 26 December 2014, in a 1–0 loss against Sheffield Wednesday. The loan spell came to an end in December.

On 27 January 2015 he joined Aberdeen on loan until the end of the season. He scored on his debut for Aberdeen on 31 January 2015, against Dundee United in the semi-final of the Scottish League Cup, but Aberdeen went on to lose the match 2–1. Daniels went on to make nine appearances for the club.

Wigan Athletic
On 30 June 2015, Daniels signed for Wigan Athletic on a three-year-deal. On 19 August 2015, Daniels scored his first goal for the club in a 3–0 home victory against Scunthorpe United. After a successful first season with the club injury blighted his second, ruling him out for the majority of the 2016–17 season.

On 31 August 2017, Daniels signed for Rochdale on a season-long loan.

He was released by Wigan at the end of the 2017–18 season.

Blackpool
Daniels spent a season with League One club Blackpool, signing on 9 August 2018. Daniels made his first competitive appearance upon returning to the club on 14 August 2018 in a 3-1 victory in the EFL Cup over Barnsley.

Luton Town
In 2019, he signed for Luton Town for an unknown fee. He played two matches and scored a goal against Derby County in a 3-2 win.

Crewe Alexandra
On 27 August 2020, Daniels signed a two-year deal with newly promoted Crewe Alexandra after leaving Luton Town, making his debut the following month in the EFL Trophy against Newcastle United's Under-21 team. He made his first league start for Crewe on 10 October 2020 against former club Wigan at Gresty Road, but was substituted after an injury early in the first half. He eventually returned to the first team in February 2021, but, on just his fourth league appearance for Crewe, suffered another injury in a 1-1 draw at former club Blackpool on 2 March 2021. After a two-week absence, he returned to the side, playing in Crewe's final 11 games of the season.

Walsall
On 24 January 2022, Daniels left Crewe Alexandra by mutual consent to sign for EFL League Two side Walsall on a five-month deal. He made his debut for the club the next day, starting in the 2–1 home defeat against Bradford City.

International career
Born in Montserrat but raised in England after the Soufriere Hills eruption, Daniels is eligible to represent England or Montserrat at international level. In October 2019, he received a call-up to represent Montserrat in their 2019–20 CONCACAF Nations League B games against El Salvador and the Dominican Republic, but declined the offer in order to focus on his recovery from injury.

Daniels played for Montserrat in their FIFA World Cup 2022 qualifier against US Virgin Islands on 2 June 2021, a match Montserrat won 4–0. He was then called up for Montserrat's CONCACAF Gold Cup qualification game against Trinidad and Tobago on 2 July 2021, but did not play.

Career statistics

Club

International

References

External links

1993 births
Living people
Montserratian footballers
Montserrat international footballers
Association football defenders
West Bromwich Albion F.C. players
Tranmere Rovers F.C. players
Gillingham F.C. players
Blackpool F.C. players
Wigan Athletic F.C. players
English Football League players
Aberdeen F.C. players
Rochdale A.F.C. players
Luton Town F.C. players
Doncaster Rovers F.C. players
Crewe Alexandra F.C. players
Walsall F.C. players
Scottish Professional Football League players